David James (born in Winnipeg, Manitoba) is a Canadian country music singer-songwriter. James was nominated for the 2014 Canadian Country Music Association Discovery Award and 2017 Rising Star Award.

Career
In August 2014, he signed to MDM Recordings Inc. His first single for the label, "What We Weren't Looking For", was released in February 2015. A music video for the song debuted on CMT in March. The song peaked at number 27 on the Billboard Canada Country chart in June. James' second single for MDM, "Some Hearts", was released in September. His third single for the label, "Lonely Girl", was released on March 8, 2016. All three songs are included on an extended play, Songs About a Girl, released on March 11. In 2020, James released the extended play If I Were You, which included the singles "Cars, Girls, And The Radio", "All the Time", and the title track whose co-writers include Tyler Hubbard of Florida Georgia Line and Hardy.

Discography

Extended plays

Singles

Music videos

References

External links

21st-century Canadian male singers
Canadian country singer-songwriters
Canadian male singer-songwriters
Living people
Musicians from Winnipeg
Year of birth missing (living people)